Ronan Pensec (born 10 July 1963) is a former French professional road bicycle racer. He was professional from 1985 to 1997.

Racing career
Pensec was born in Douarnenez, Finistère, France. He became professional in 1985 with the Peugeot cycling team. His best performances in the Tour de France were in the first editions he competed in, where he finished sixth in the 1986 edition and seventh in the 1988 Tour de France. Pensec continued his career, still under Roger Legeay's guidance, with the Z team with Greg Lemond as his leader, who later became one of his best friends in the peloton. In the 1990 Tour de France Pensec wore the yellow jersey. While he defended his lead on the Alpe d'Huez, Pensec lost the lead to Italian Claudio Chiappucci in an Individual time trial. Pensec retired in 1997 after riding the French national championships.

Charitable efforts
In 1994 he created the cycling event called La Ronan Pensec which is an event that raises money for AIDS research and AIDS fighting organisations. The operation also financially contributed to educate young high school students. Over the years, Ronan Pensec donated €350,000 to various associations.

Media and other work
Pensec is now a television commentator and consultant for France Télévision on major cycling events. He gives the producer tactical advice on which live images he should select. In 2003, he founded his own travel agency.

Major results

1985
1st place overall Étoile des Espoirs
1986
Lamballe
Meymac
Saint-Martin de Landelles
Villeneuve-sur-Yonne
Tour de France:
6th place overall classification
1987
Lanarvily (Cyclo-cross)
Étoile de Bessèges
1988
Callac
Route du Sud
Grand Prix de Rennes
Tour de France:
7th place overall classification
1989
Angers
1990
Boucles de l'Aulne
Lèves
Ronde d'Aix-en-Provence
Tour de France:
Wearing yellow jersey for two days
1992
Brest
GP Ouest-France
Monmarault

References

External links 
Official site with details of Tour de France touring rides

Official Tour de France results for Ronan Pensec

French male cyclists
1963 births
Living people
Cycling announcers
Sportspeople from Finistère
Cyclists from Brittany